Kenneth Gwane Evans (born March 19, 1960) is an American football coach. He is currently the defensive coordinator at Rogers High School in Rogers, Arkansas. Evans previously served as head football coach at Northeastern State University in Tahlequah, Oklahoma and  East Central High School in Tulsa, Oklahoma. Evans has worked as an assistant coach at Oklahoma, Florida, North Texas, and Louisiana Tech.

Coaching career
Evans began his coaching career in 1981 at Miami High School in Miami, Oklahoma. He joined the collegiate ranks the following year as a graduate assistant at the University of Oklahoma under coach Barry Switzer. Evans remained in that role until 1985, when he joined coach Galen Hall at the University of Florida as a wide receivers coach for one season. He then spent the next 12 years under coach Jon Lantz at Southeastern Oklahoma State and Missouri Southern. He helped turn both programs around as defensive and recruiting coordinator, and coached future NFL players such as Rod Smith.

Evans returned to the NCAA Division I level in 1998 as defensive coordinator at the University of North Texas under head coach Darrell Dickey. During his eight years coaching there, the Mean Green won four Sun Belt Conference championships and made four appearances at the New Orleans Bowl. He also received the National Assistant Coach of the Year award in 2005 by the Football Foundation. Evans later coached at Louisiana Tech under Derek Dooley for one season.

In 2008, Evans was hired as head coach of the Northeastern State RiverHawks football program. He led the Riverhawks to two of winning seasons, which included a Lone Star Conference North Division title in 2010 and an appearance in the Mineral Water Bowl in 2011. This was the program's first winning seasons in a decade. After joining the Mid-America Intercollegiate Athletics Association (MIAA), the Riverhawks posted a 4–6 record in 2012 and a 2–9 record in 2013. Immediately after the completion of the 2013 season, Evans was let go as head coach.

After a brief stint as head coach of East Central High School in Tulsa, Oklahoma, Evans returned to Missouri Southern as defensive coordinator under head coach Denver Johnson in 2015. In 2018, Evans returned to the high school level to become defensive coordinator at  Rogers High School in Arkansas, where he currently coaches.

Personal life
Evans is married to Tammi, and has one son, Elliott.

Head coaching record

College

High school

References

External links
 
 Northeastern State profile

1960 births
Living people
Florida Gators football players
Louisiana Tech Bulldogs football coaches
Missouri Southern Lions football coaches
North Texas Mean Green football coaches
Northeastern State RiverHawks football coaches
Oklahoma Sooners football coaches
Southeastern Oklahoma State Savage Storm football coaches
High school football coaches in Arkansas
High school football coaches in Oklahoma